The 2010 Quebec Men's Provincial Curling Championship was held February 7–14 in at the Aréna de Grand-Mère in Grand-Mère, Quebec. The winning team, skipped by Serge Reid represented Quebec at the 2010 Tim Hortons Brier in Halifax, Nova Scotia.

Teams

Pool A

Standings

Results

February 8
Ménard 10-4 Briand
Fournier 11-4 Côté
Dupuis 12-3 Marchand
Reid 8-6 Tardif
Bédard 8-1 Hébert
Marchand 6-5 Bédard (11)
Ménard 7-4 Hébert
Tardif 10-2 Briand
Dupuis 10-2 Côté
Reid 8-7 Fournier

February 9
Ménard 10-4 Tardif
Reid 9-3 Côté
Briand 9-1 Marchanrd
Fournier 8-3 Bédard
Dupuis 6-5 Hébert
Dupuis 6-5 Fournier
Bédard 10-4 Briand
Ménard 9-2 Côté
Tardif 7-6 Hébert
Reid 8-4 Marchand

February 10
Bédard 7-6 Tardif (11)
Reid 7-4 Dupuis
Hébert 7-6 Fournier
Ménard 8-5 Marchand
Côté 11-9 Briand (11)
Marchand 8-6 Côté
Briand 6-5 Hébert
Ménard 7-1 Reid
Bédard 9-4 Dupuis
Fournier 7-3 Tardif

February 11
Hébert 11-3 Côté
Marchand 9-5 Fournier
Dupuis 13-8 Tardif
Reid 8-2 Briand
Ménard 8-3 Bédard
Fournier 7-4 Briand
Dupuis 10-7 Ménard
Reid 11-7 Bédard (11)
Marchand 8-7 Hébert (11)
Tardif 9-5 Côté

February 12
Reid 8-6 Hébert
Tardif 7-6 Marchand (11)
Bédard 8-7 Côté(11)
Fournier 10-7 Ménard
Dupuis 11-8 Briand

Pool B

Standings

Results

February 8
Ferland 7-4 Munroe
Wharry 8-1 Chartrand
Lodge 8-6 Desjardins
Butler 10-6 Laurin
Charette 11-4 Beaudoin
Charette 8-5 Lodge
Ferland 8-4 Beaudoin
Laurin 11-9 Munroe
Desjardins 8-3 Chartrand
Butler 8-5 Wharry

February 9
Ferland 7-3 Laurin
Butler 7-4 Chartrand
Lodge 8-7 Munroe
Wharry 9-5 Charette
Desjardins 7-6 Beaudoin
Desjardins 9-3 Wharry
Munroe 7-6 Charette
Ferland 7-3 Chartrand
Beaudoin 11-4 Laurin
Butler 10-8 Lodge (11)

February 10
Butler 9-6 Beaudoin
Laurin 6-5 Lodge
Charette 11-2 Chartrand
Ferland 8-6 Wharry
Desjardins 6-5 Munroe (11)
Lodge 8-4 Chartrand
Beaudoin 6-2 Munroe
Ferland 9-7 Butler
Charette 9-5 Desjardins
Laurin 6-5 Wharry

February 11
Charette 8-3 Laurin
Butler 8-5 Desjardins
Beaudoin 11-5 Wharry
Ferland 8-7 Lodge
Munroe 8-3 Chartrand
Chartrand 8-5 Beaudoin
Lodge 12-6 Whrry
Desjardins 8-1 Laurin
Butler 6-4 Munroe
Ferland 9-4 Charette

February 12
Munroe 7-6 Wharry
Ferland 6-4 Desjardins
Charette 7-6 Butler
Beaudoin 9-7 Lodge
Chartrand 10-2 Laurin

Playoffs

Quarter final play-ins
February 13

A2 vs B3

B2 vs A3

Page playoffs

A1 vs B1

A3 vs B3

Semi-final

Final

External links
Coverage on Curlingzone.com

Quebec Mens Provincial Curling Championship, 2010
Curling competitions in Quebec
February 2010 sports events in Canada
2010 in Quebec
Shawinigan